Oluwafeyiseitan Asagidigbi (born 28 January 1999), commonly known as Feyiseitan Asagidigbi, is a Nigerian professional footballer who plays as an attacking midfielder for Club Almagro.

Club career
Asagidigbi spent a period of his youth career in his hometown with Ilesa West, a club that his father worked for. In 2017, after interest from Rosario Central, Asagidigbi joined the ranks of Banfield from Karamone. After a few years progressing through their academy, the attacking midfielder featured in the club's pre-season preparations in mid-2019 - featuring in a number of friendlies. His competitive bow didn't occur though, as he later departed on loan in November 2020 to Primera B Metropolitana side JJ Urquiza. He made his senior debut on 19 December during a 2–1 defeat away to Villa San Carlos.

In June 2022, Asagidigbi joined Primera Nacional side Club Almagro.

International career
After impressing for Ilesa West, Asagidigbi received call-ups from Nigeria's U13 side. He was, despite previously featuring for them, left out of the squad for a 2010 tournament in London, England. The same coach, however, soon selected him for the U15s, as they went on to win the 2014 African Youth Games competition in Gaborone, Botswana; defeating Swaziland in the final. He also featured, in an Africa Cup of Nations qualifier, for the U17s. In 2018, U20s manager Haruna Ilerika called Asagidigbi up for his preliminary squad ahead of the 2019 Africa Cup of Nations in Niger - but he missed the final cut.

Personal life
Asagidigbi's father, Seun, was a professional footballer; notably playing in Saudi Arabia and in their homeland for the likes of Shooting Stars and Stationery Stores. His brother, Madewa, also played football in Nigeria. As a youngster, Asagidigbi attended Total Child Nursery & Primary School and The Salvation Army Secondary School.

Career statistics
.

Honours
Nigeria U15
African Youth Games: 2014

Notes

References

External links

1999 births
Living people
Sportspeople from Osun State
Nigerian footballers
Nigeria youth international footballers
Nigeria under-20 international footballers
Association football midfielders
Nigerian expatriate footballers
Expatriate footballers in Argentina
Nigerian expatriate sportspeople in Argentina
Primera B Metropolitana players
Club Atlético Banfield footballers
Asociación Social y Deportiva Justo José de Urquiza players
Club Almagro players